Fincantieri – Cantieri Navali Italiani S.p.A. is an Italian shipbuilding company based in Trieste, Italy. The following is a list of ships built by Fincantieri:

1959–1970

1971–1980

1981–1990

1991–2000

2000-2010

2011–2020

Notes 

Fincantieri
Ships Fincantieri
Fincantieri